The Artistry of Michael Bolotin is an album by Michael Bolton.  The third and final album, using his given name. It is a compilation from his first 2 RCA albums (Michael Bolotin, 1975 and Everyday of My Life, 1976).

Track listing
"Rocky Mountain Way"
"Time Is on My Side"
"Your Love"
"You're No Good"
"It's Just A Feeling"
"Take Me As I Am"
"Dancing In The Street"
"These Eyes"
"If I Had Your Love"
"Lost In The City"

References

Michael Bolton compilation albums
1993 albums
RCA Records compilation albums